Saintmotelevision (stylized as saintmotelevision) is the second studio album by American indie pop band Saint Motel. It was released on October 21, 2016, by Elektra Records.

Singles
The album's first single, "Move", was released on August 12, 2016. "Move" is featured on the soundtrack of FIFA 17.

A music video was made for "You Can Be You" and released on September 15, 2016, while a video for "Born Again" was released on October 14, 2016, and a Spotify single followed on March 1, 2017.

Track listing

Personnel
Credits for saintmotelevision adapted from Tidal.
Saint Motel
 A/J Jackson – lead vocals, guitar, piano, album artwork
 Aaron Sharp – lead guitar
 Greg Erwin – drums
 Dak Lerdamornpong – bass

Additional musicians
 Sabrina Jasmine – background vocals (2)
 Brooke Graeff – background vocals (3)
 Tiffany Borland – background vocals (5)
 Frederik Thaae – background vocals (10)
 Tim Pagnotta – background vocals (10)
 Nathan Kersey-Wilson – saxophone (1, 5-7)
 James King – saxophone (2, 4, 8, 9)
 Vincent Dawson – trumpet (1, 5–7)
 Ronnie Blake – trumpet (2–4, 8, 9)
 Tommy Leonard – additional keyboards (7) 
 Tom Peyton – trombone (10)

Technical
 Dave Cooley – mastering
 Mark Needham – mixing
 Brian Phillips – engineering
 Dave Cerminara - engineering assistance
 Matt Meiners - album artwork

Charts

References

2016 albums
Elektra Records albums
Parlophone albums
Saint Motel albums